Ivan Mikhailovich Moskvin (18 June 1874, in Moscow – 16 February 1946, in Moscow) was a Russian and Soviet actor and theater director. People's Artist of the USSR (1936).

He became director of the Moscow Art Theatre in 1943. He was a student in the Moscow Philharmonic Orchestra from 1893 to 1896. He also performed in the Yaroslavl company and the Korsh company in Moscow.

Filmography
 Polikushka (1922)
 The Stationmaster (1925)
 An Hour with Chekhov (1929)
 Wish upon a Pike (1938)

References

External links

 

1874 births
1946 deaths
Male actors from the Russian Empire

First convocation members of the Supreme Soviet of the Soviet Union
Moscow Art Theatre
Honored Artists of the RSFSR
People's Artists of the RSFSR
People's Artists of the USSR
Stalin Prize winners
Recipients of the Order of Lenin
Recipients of the Order of the Red Banner of Labour

Soviet male film actors
Soviet male silent film actors
Soviet male stage actors
Soviet theatre directors
Spoken word artists
Theatre directors from the Russian Empire
Burials at Novodevichy Cemetery